Kudakwashe Denga Bhasikoro (born 1 August 1989) is a Zimbabwean first-class cricketer. He plays for Mid West Rhinos in first-class cricket matches.

Kudakwashe made his first-class cricket debut for Mid West Rhinos against Southern Rocks in 2014. He also made his List A debut for Mid West Rhinos against Mashonaland Eagles in 2014.

References

External links 
 
Profile at CricHQ

1989 births
Living people
Zimbabwean cricketers
Mid West Rhinos cricketers